Rogers Brothers Farmstead, also known as Cottonwood Farm and Austin Rogers House, is a historic home located at Cape Vincent in Jefferson County, New York. It was built in 1838 and is a -story, five-by-two-bay, vernacular limestone farmhouse.  A 1-story frame wing was added shortly after it was built.

It was listed on the National Register of Historic Places in 1998.

References

Houses on the National Register of Historic Places in New York (state)
Georgian architecture in New York (state)
Houses completed in 1838
Houses in Jefferson County, New York
National Register of Historic Places in Jefferson County, New York